Roiz is the name of:

 Michael Roiz (born 1983), Israeli chess player
 Sasha Roiz (born 1973), Canadian actor
 Javier Roiz, Spanish political theorist